The Smaiylov Cabinet is the 12th composition of the Government of Kazakhstan under the leadership of Prime Minister Alihan Smaiylov. It was formed after the previous government, led by Prime Minister Askar Mamin, was dismissed by President Kassym-Jomart Tokayev on 5 January 2022 as a result of the 2022 Kazakh protests. The membership of the cabinet was announced by the president on 11 January 2022. Eight of the 21 ministers of the previous cabinet were replaced.

Formation 
On 5 January 2022, while in amidst of the nationwide instability, President Kassym-Jomart Tokayev appointed Älihan Smaiylov to take over Prime Minister Asqar Mamin's role in leading the government temporarily as acting PM until a new composition would be formed. Prior to that, Smayilov served as first deputy prime minister and finance minister in Mamin's government.

During an extraordinary session of the CTSO on 10 January 2022, President Tokayev announced that he would submit proposed candidacies for ministerial posts to the Parliament the following day to form a new cabinet. On 11 January, at the lower house Majilis session, Tokayev named Smaiylov for prime ministerial candidacy where he was unanimously elected by all present 89 MPs across party lines.

Composition 
A majority of ministers from the previous composition retained their posts while eight portfolios saw new appointees with two of them formerly serving in the cabinet before returning which were:

 Minister of Healthcare Ajar Giniat, previously served as the vice minister
 Minister of Information and Social Development Asqar Omarov, previously served as the vice minister
 Minister of Justice Qanat Musin, previously headed the judicial board for administrative cases and was judge in the Kazakh Supreme Court
 Minister of Industry and Infrastructure Development Qaiyrbek Uskenbaev, previously served as the first vice minister
 Minister of Culture and Sports Dauren Abaev, previously worked in the Presidential Administration under Tokayev
 Minister of National Economy Alibek Quantyrov, previously served as the vice minister
 Minister of Energy Bulat Aqchulaqov, previously worked in the Samruk-Kazyna
 Deputy Prime Minister Bakhyt Sultanov, previously served as the Minister of Trade and Integration

Members of the cabinet are:

Ministers

References

Cabinets of Kazakhstan
2022 in Kazakhstan
2022 establishments in Kazakhstan
Cabinets established in 2022
Current governments